The Maillary was a French automobile manufactured only in 1901.  A 6 cv shaft-drive voiturette, it was built in Puteaux.

References
 
 David Burgess Wise, The New Illustrated Encyclopedia of Automobiles.

Defunct motor vehicle manufacturers of France